The Australian Christians is a political party in Australia that is described as socially conservative and Christian-conservative. It was founded in 2011 and was registered by the Australian Electoral Commission on 15 December 2011. It is primarily active in Western Australia and contests both state and federal election, although it is yet to elect any representatives. The party aims to represent Christian values.

History
The party was formed after the Victorian and Western Australian branches of the Christian Democratic Party (CDP) voted to form a new party. The party has endorsed senate candidates in Western Australia, Victoria and Tasmania and plans to expand into South Australia and Queensland. The party has decided not to operate in New South Wales, where the CDP has one seat in the Legislative Council.

The party contested the 2012 Melbourne state by-election, receiving about 1% of the vote. The party contested the 2013 Western Australian state election, receiving 1.95% of the vote.

It also contested the 2013, 2016 and 2019 federal elections. At the 2016 federal election, Australian Christians fielded senate candidates for Western Australia, Victoria and Queensland and a total of eighteen candidates for seats in the House of Representatives across Victoria and Western Australia

The Party has been growing across Western Australia, and has contested all State and by-elections since 2011. The Party is headquartered in Osborne Park, WA. 

In May 2017, Cory Bernardi, the leader of the Australian Conservatives, met the national and Victoria state leaders of the Australian Christians to discuss a merger between the two parties. In September 2017, the Victoria state leadership of the Australian Christians agreed to merge the branch with the Conservatives, whilst the WA branch remained. (The Australian Conservatives subsequently ceased operating in June 2019).

The Western Australian branch stood candidates for both the House of Representatives and the Senate at the 2019 federal election. It fielded candidates at the 2021 WA state election but did not win any seats.

The May 2022 federal election saw the Australian Christians contest WA seats, both in the senate and for nine in the House of Representatives.

Election results
Senate

Western Australia

Victoria

See also
 Christian politics in Australia
 Christian Democratic Party
 Family First Party
 Australian Conservatives

References

External links 
 Australian Christians website

 
2011 establishments in Australia
Christian political parties in Australia
Conservative parties in Australia
Political parties established in 2011
Political parties in Victoria (Australia)
Social conservative parties